Manik Khan (born 2 January 1997) is a Bangladeshi cricketer. He made his List A debut for Prime Doleshwar Sporting Club in the 2017–18 Dhaka Premier Division Cricket League on 9 February 2018. He made his Twenty20 debut for Prime Doleshwar Sporting Club in the 2018–19 Dhaka Premier Division Twenty20 Cricket League on 25 February 2019, taking a hat-trick. He made his first-class debut on 17 October 2019, for Dhaka Metropolis in the 2019–20 National Cricket League.

In November 2019, he was named in Bangladesh's squad for the men's cricket tournament at the 2019 South Asian Games. The Bangladesh team won the gold medal, after they beat Sri Lanka by seven wickets in the final.

References

External links
 

1997 births
Living people
Bangladeshi cricketers
Dhaka Metropolis cricketers
Prime Doleshwar Sporting Club cricketers
Place of birth missing (living people)
South Asian Games gold medalists for Bangladesh
South Asian Games medalists in cricket